Golden Circle may refer to:

 Golden Circle (Iceland), Icelandic tourist route
 Golden Circle (company), Australian food processor
 Golden Circle Air, U.S. aviation manufacturer
 Golden Circle, the proposal by the U.S. secret society the  Knights of the Golden Circle to expand the slave-owning territories of the U.S. by annexing other territories
Golden Circle (businessmen), nickname for ten businessmen who controversially bought shares in Anglo Irish Bank
 The golden circle, a leadership model described by Simon Sinek in Start With Why
 Golden Circle of Golf Festival (1961 tournament) LPGA golf tournament
 Kingsman: The Golden Circle, 2017 action spy film

See also
 At the 'Golden Circle' Stockholm two albums by the Ornette Coleman Trio released in 1966
 Gold Circle (U.S. company) discount department store
 Gold Circle Films (U.S. company)
 Silver Circle, the second tier of English law firms; also known as the Golden Circle
 Golden Ring (disambiguation)
 Golden (disambiguation)
 Circle (disambiguation)